Bağbanlı may refer to:
 Bağbanlı, Quba, Azerbaijan
 Bağbanlar, Bilasuvar, Azerbaijan

See also 
 Bağbanlar (disambiguation)